Yegor Aleksandrovich Bogomolsky (born 3 June 2000) is a Belarusian professional footballer who plays for Neftchi Baku.

Career

Club
On 20 July 2022, Neftchi Baku announced the signing of Bogomolsky from Minsk, to a three-year contract.

Honours
Dinamo Brest
Belarusian Premier League champion: 2019

References

External links 
 
 
 Profile at Dinamo Minsk website

2000 births
Living people
Belarusian footballers
Association football forwards
Belarus international footballers
FC Dinamo Minsk players
FC Dynamo Brest players
FC Rukh Brest players
FC Minsk players
Neftçi PFK players
Belarusian expatriate footballers
Expatriate footballers in Azerbaijan